

History
Snowgoons is a German underground hip hop production team composed of DJ Illegal (Manuu Rückert) and Det Gunner (D. Keller). In 2011, producers Sicknature (Jeppe Andersen) from Denmark and J.S. Kuster (Johann Sebastian Kuster) from Germany joined the group. Det and DJ Illegal first started in 1999 as the two original members. In 2006, they decided to a add a third  member, Torben from Germany, who was a part of the group until 2008. After Torben left, they decided to add a third member again in the same year, DJ Waxwork from Germany, who was a part of the group until 2009.
The Snowgoons are known for using orchestral/epic samples and for working with underground MCs, like members of Wu-Tang Clan, AOTP, Boot Camp Click and La Coka Nostra. The team cite DJ Premier, Alchemist and RZA as influences. They have released several Snowgoons albums. They also did several collaboration albums with artists like Reef the Lost Cauze, M.O.P., PMD and Sean Strange (as Goondox) and Onyx. They planned to release an album with the hiphop group Krush Unit for several years, but the album was never released. 

In 2011, they launched their own record label called Goon MuSick.
In 2020, J.S. Kuster departed from Snowgoons and then started to go by the name Tengo and formed a duo rap group with the German rapper named BX under the name “Tengo & BX”.

Members

Current members
 Det Gunner (1999-present)
 DJ Illegal (1999-present)
Sicknature (2011-present)

Former members
 Torben (2006-2008)
 Torben (2008-2009)
 J.S. Kuster (2011-2020)

Discography

Albums

Mixtapes/Compilations

Other

Sicknature

Production discography 
2003
Donald D – The Return of the Culture
2005
Doujah Raze – The Inauguration
Majik Most – Who What When Where (feat. Celph Titled)
2006
The Devil'z Rejects – Incredibles
The Devil'z Rejectz – Dead Man Walking
2007
Apathy – A.O.T.P.
2008
Brooklyn Academy – The Last Passion
Brooklyn Academy – Black Out (feat. Jean Grae)
Canibus & Oobe – PL∞-Spitfest (Poet Laureate Infinity Mix)
Canibus – War (Poet Laureate Infinity Mix)
Dra-Q & Damion Davis – Rewind that sh!t
King Syze – Cement Work
Sabac Red – The Commitment
Doap Nixon – Heaven Is Calling (feat. Cynthia Holliday)
2009
NATO ft J-Ro (The Alkaholiks) – Cross Boarders
NATO – Broadcast (feat. Blak Twang & Seanie T.)
Nervous Wreck & Chino XL – Knucklesandwich
Godilla – Lion's Den / The Getback (feat. Adlib & UG)
King & The Cauze – Snowgoons (feat. Adlib, Ali Armz & Godilla)
Randam Luck – Street Goons (feat. Jimmy Powers)
Randam Luck – Verbal Holocaust remix (feat. Ill Bill)
Randam Luck – Raw remix (feat. Vinnie Paz)
Viro the Virus – Heat
Para Bellum – Az Első Menet
Para Bellum – Torkolattűz
Sick Jacken (of Psycho Realm) – Sick Life (feat. Cynic & Bacardi Riam)
2010
Psych Ward – Lost Planet (feat. Snored Putz)
Chief Kamachi – 2nd Lecture
M-Dot – The Real & the Raw remix (feat. Jaysaun of Special Teamz)
Mark Deez – The Oracle (feat. Dr iLL & Powder)
Mark Deez – I'm Here Now
Fanatik – Franchement
Revolution of the Mind – Die for My People
The Lost Children of Babylon – Babylon A.D.
The Lost Children of Babylon – Skull & Bones
The Lost Children of Babylon – Beware The Zeitgeist
The Lost Children of Babylon – The Venus Project
Sean Strange – Diabolical Decibels (feat. Exlib, Meth Mouth & Nems)
Powder – Flowers
N.B.S. – B.O.S.T.O.N.
2011
Killakikitt – Intro
Killakikitt – A kocka el van vetve (feat. NKS)
2012
N.B.S. – The Essence of Real Rap (feat. Akrobatik)
2013
Demigodz – The Summer of Sam
Nature – New York Niggaz
Psych Ward – Subterranean (feat. Solomon Child, J Reno & Banish)
Hus Kingpin – Pyramid Points (feat. Rozewood)
N.B.S. – Perm Time
N.B.S. – Smiley (feat. Smiley & Sicknature)
2014
Diabolic – Suffolk's Most Wanted (feat. R.A. the Rugged Man)
Diabolic – Bad Dream
2016
Golden Era Cypher

References 

Other sources
Snowgoons interview by VibeRated.com
Snowgoons interview by 215hiphop.com
Snowgoons interview by Planeturban.com
Snowgoons albums on UGHH.com
Snowgoons on Babygrande's website

External links 

 

German hip hop groups
Hip hop record producers
Record production teams
Musical quartets